Route 45 is a highway in northwest Missouri, US in Buchanan County and Platte County which is largely in the bottom land alongside the Missouri River.

Route description

Its northern terminus is U.S. Route 59 just east of Atchison, Kansas where 59 turns sharply to St. Joseph, Missouri north while 45 heads south towards Kansas City, Missouri.

It overlaps Route 273 until just south of Weston, Missouri where 273 breaks off to head east.

At Beverly, Missouri, in what is referred to locally as the "Beverly Curve", it intersects Route 92 going east to Platte City, Missouri and west to Leavenworth, Kansas.

About three miles (5 km) later at East Leavenworth, Missouri, Route 45 intersects its spur which goes northwest to Leavenworth. The spur, which is signed as "Route 45" and also known as the "Leavenworth cutoff", was built as a shortcut from Leavenworth, Kansas to Kansas City during the construction of the Centennial Bridge (Leavenworth, Kansas).  Even though it is in Missouri it was maintained by the city of Leavenworth until the tolls were removed from the Centennial Bridge in May 1977.  This is now maintained by MODOT.

The length of the highway between the convergence of the spur and the intersection with I-435 to the south was quite narrow, each lane being less than 11 feet wide.  In addition, there were large ruts just off the edges of the highway in some areas. This width shrank even more over the Platte River bridge just south of Farley, which was finally replaced after 79 years—the original bridge was built in 1933 and the replacement bridge (built just to the east of the old bridge) was completed in 2012.  Recent construction in the spring months of 2013 has widened the road and eliminated the danger of ruts, although as of May 2013, there has not been a change in the painted lanes.

South of Farley, Missouri, the road leaves the Missouri River bottoms and heads southeast past Interstate 435.  The section between Interstate 435 and Interstate 29 that passes the National Golf Club of Kansas City is named the Tom Watson Parkway after the Kansas City native champion golfer who also designed the club's course.

At the intersection with Interstate 435, the road widens to become a four-lane concrete avenue.  The road's southern terminal point is Interstate 29.

The road, which is almost exclusively rural until entering Kansas City suburban development at I-435, is frequently listed as a "scenic route" as it stays close to the Missouri River bluffs and has commanding views of Fort Leavenworth.

History

Major intersections

References

045
Transportation in Buchanan County, Missouri
Transportation in Platte County, Missouri
Transportation in the Kansas City metropolitan area
Transportation in Kansas City, Missouri